Tommy Dorfman (born May 13, 1992) is an American actress, best known for playing Ryan Shaver in the Netflix series 13 Reasons Why (2017).

Early life and education
Dorfman was born and raised in Atlanta, Georgia to a Jewish family.  Her cousin is Andi Dorfman, a former contestant on The Bachelorette. Dorfman graduated from Fordham University's drama program in 2015 with a B.A. in theatre arts.

Career
After graduating from university, Dorfman was cast in the role of Ryan Shaver on the Netflix drama 13 Reasons Why, which premiered in 2017. Also that year, she helped design a fashion collection with ASOS, and in October was honored with the Rising Star Award by GLAAD.

In the spring of 2019, Dorfman made her New York theatrical debut in The New Group's production of Jeremy O. Harris' play Daddy, directed by Danya Taymor.

Personal life
Dorfman is queer. Dorfman and Peter Zurkuhlen became engaged in April 2015 and married in Portland, Maine on November 12, 2016. In July 2021, Dorfman revealed she and Zurkuhlen had divorced but remain friends.

In November 2017, Dorfman came out as non-binary and began using they pronouns. On July 22, 2021, Dorfman came out as a transgender woman and began using she pronouns. She revealed in an interview that she had already been "privately identifying and living as a woman" for almost a year. She chose to retain her birth name of Tommy, to which she feels "very connected" and which honors her mother's brother who died when Dorfman was a month old. In April 2022, Dorfman identified as a lesbian.

Filmography

References

External links

Living people
1992 births
Jewish American actresses
Actresses from Atlanta
American television actresses
Fordham University alumni
American LGBT actors
LGBT people from Georgia (U.S. state)
Transgender actresses
Transgender Jews
LGBT Jews
21st-century American Jews
21st-century LGBT people
Female gender nonconformity
21st-century American women
Alumni of The Paideia School